Gary Morsch (born 1952) is an American physician, philanthropist and author. He is the founder of Heart to Heart International and One Heart Many Hands, and  the founder/CEO of Docs Who Care.

Heart to Heart International 
In 1992, Morsch helped establish the organization,  Heart to Heart International. He currently serves as a board member. This network of volunteers mobilizes resources to help address  critical medical needs around the world.  It has formed a partnership between pharmaceutical companies, corporate sponsors, civic and religious organizations, and individuals. Since its founding, HHI has delivered more than $1 billion of pharmaceuticals and medical supplies to over 150 countries.

Docs Who Care 
In 1993 Dr. Morsch left his private practice to devote more time to volunteering. He founded Docs Who Care, a for-profit organization providing healthcare to communities. The company partners with rural and critical access hospitals to provide Family Practice, Emergency Room and locum tenens staffing.

Books Written 
Ministry: It's Not Just for Ministers - Eddy Hall and Gary Morsch – Beacon Hill Press of Kansas City,, 1993 According to WorldCat, the book is located in 28 libraries  
The Lay Ministry Revolution - Eddy Hall and Gary Morsch – Grand Rapids, Mich. : Baker Books, 1995 According to WorldCat, the book is located in 72 libraries 
Heart and Soul: Awakening Your Passion to Serve  - Gary Morsch and Dean Nelson –  Beacon Hill Press of Kansas City, 1997 According to WorldCat, the book is located in 34 libraries 
When's There's No Burning Bush – Eddy Hall and Gary Morsch – Baker Books 2004 According to WorldCat, the book is located in 45 libraries 
The Power of Serving Others: You Can Start Where You Are – Gary Morsch and Dean Nelson –San Francisco, CA : Berrett-Koehler, 2006–2015  According to WorldCat, the book is located in 1440 libraries
You'll Never Be The Same: Transform Your Life By Serving Others – Gary Morsch and Steve Weber – 2015 According to WorldCat, the book is located in 866 libraries

References

Living people
20th-century American physicians
American philanthropists
American male writers
1952 births